Polythlipta albicaudalis is a moth in the family Crambidae. It was described by Dutch entomologist Pieter Snellen in 1880. It is found in Indonesia (Sulawesi).

References

Spilomelinae
Moths described in 1880